Mussoll is a dance performed by Goan Catholic men and women of Chandor, Goa, India with songs associated to Hindu gods as well as Catholic saints like Mother Mary.

Further reading

.

See also

References
The Garland encyclopedia of world music, p.39

Goan dances
Goan music